Bakhtiar is a 1955 Soviet comedy film directed by Latif Safarov.

Plot 
Everybody convinces Bakhtiar Muradov, who has a beautiful voice, to go to the conservatory. But the young man decides to become an oilman, like his father, who died at the front of the Patriotic War. And he realizes his intention   becomes a drilling master. Favorite girl Bakhtiar, Sasha Verkhovskaya, leaves for Moscow to study in the geological survey institute. Together with her rival and rival Bakhtiyar   fat Yusuf, going to devote himself to the trade business. At this time in the club of oil workers agile businessman Aga-Bala arranges a series of performances by Bakhtiar Muradov.

Cast
 Rashid Behbudov as Bakhtiar  (voice by Viktor Rozhdestvensky)
 Sofa Besirzade as Member of the Commission
 Tamara Chernova as Sasha
 Merziyye Davudova as Gulbadam
 Mukhlis Dzhanni-zade as Kerim  
 Ismail Efendiyev as Rza Ismayilov
 Suleyman Elesgerov as Club director
 Tatyana Pelttser as aunt Natasha
 Munavvar Kalantarli as Gyulzar Huseynova

References

External links 
 

1955 films
Soviet comedy films
Azerbaijani-language films
1950s Russian-language films
1955 comedy films
Soviet black-and-white films
Azerbaijanfilm films
Soviet-era Azerbaijanian films
Azerbaijani comedy films
1950s multilingual films
Russian multilingual films
Soviet multilingual films
Russian black-and-white films
Russian comedy films
Azerbaijani black-and-white films
Azerbaijani multilingual films